Heinrich Rudolf Hertz (22 February 1857 – 1 January 1894) was a German physicist who first conclusively proved the existence of the electromagnetic waves predicted by James Clerk Maxwell's equations of electromagnetism. The unit of frequency, cycle per second, was named the "hertz" in his honor.

Biography
Heinrich Rudolf Hertz was born in 1857 in Hamburg, then a sovereign state of the German Confederation, into a prosperous and cultured Hanseatic family. His father was Gustav Ferdinand Hertz. His mother was Anna Elisabeth Pfefferkorn.

While studying at the Gelehrtenschule des Johanneums in Hamburg, Hertz showed an aptitude for sciences as well as languages, learning Arabic. He studied sciences and engineering in the German cities of Dresden, Munich and Berlin, where he studied under Gustav R. Kirchhoff and Hermann von Helmholtz. In 1880, Hertz obtained his PhD from the University of Berlin, and for the next three years remained for post-doctoral study under Helmholtz, serving as his assistant. In 1883, Hertz took a post as a lecturer in theoretical physics at the University of Kiel. In 1885, Hertz became a full professor at the University of Karlsruhe.

In 1886, Hertz married Elisabeth Doll, the daughter of Max Doll, a lecturer in geometry at Karlsruhe. They had two daughters: Johanna, born on 20 October 1887 and Mathilde, born on 14 January 1891, who went on to become a notable biologist. During this time Hertz conducted his landmark research into electromagnetic waves.

Hertz took a position of Professor of Physics and Director of the Physics Institute in Bonn on 3 April 1889, a position he held until his death. During this time he worked on theoretical mechanics with his work published in the book Die Prinzipien der Mechanik in neuem Zusammenhange dargestellt (The Principles of Mechanics Presented in a New Form), published posthumously in 1894.

Death
In 1892, Hertz was diagnosed with an infection (after a bout of severe migraines) and underwent operations to treat the illness. He died after complications in surgery in attempts to fix his condition that was causing these migraines, which some consider to have been a malignant bone condition. He died at the age of 36 in Bonn, Germany, in 1894, and was buried in the Ohlsdorf Cemetery in Hamburg.

Hertz's wife, Elisabeth Hertz (née Doll; 1864–1941), did not remarry and he was survived by his daughters, Johanna (1887–1967) and Mathilde (1891–1975). Neither ever married or had children, hence Hertz has no living descendants.

Scientific work

Electromagnetic waves

In 1864 Scottish mathematical physicist James Clerk Maxwell proposed a comprehensive theory of electromagnetism, now called Maxwell's equations.  Maxwell's theory predicted that coupled electric and magnetic fields could travel through space as an "electromagnetic wave".  Maxwell proposed that light consisted of electromagnetic waves of short wavelength, but no one had been able to prove this, or generate or detect electromagnetic waves of other wavelengths.

During Hertz's studies in 1879 Helmholtz suggested that Hertz's doctoral dissertation be on testing Maxwell's theory. Helmholtz had also proposed the "Berlin Prize" problem that year at the Prussian Academy of Sciences for anyone who could experimentally prove an electromagnetic effect in the polarization and depolarization of insulators, something predicted by Maxwell's theory. Helmholtz was sure Hertz was the most likely candidate to win it. Not seeing any way to build an apparatus to experimentally test this, Hertz thought it was too difficult, and worked on electromagnetic induction instead. Hertz did produce an analysis of Maxwell's equations during his time at Kiel, showing they did have more validity than the then prevalent "action at a distance" theories.

In the autumn of 1886, after Hertz received his professorship at Karlsruhe, he was experimenting with a pair of Riess spirals  when he noticed that discharging a Leyden jar into one of these coils produced a spark in the other coil. With an idea on how to build an apparatus, Hertz now had a way to proceed with the "Berlin Prize" problem of 1879 on proving Maxwell's theory (although the actual prize had expired uncollected in 1882). He used a dipole antenna consisting of two collinear one-meter wires with a spark gap between their inner ends, and zinc spheres attached to the outer ends for capacitance, as a radiator.  The antenna was excited by pulses of high voltage of about 30 kilovolts applied between the two sides from a Ruhmkorff coil.  He received the waves with a resonant single-loop antenna with a micrometer spark gap between the ends. This experiment produced and received what are now called radio waves in the very high frequency range.

Between 1886 and 1889 Hertz conducted a series of experiments that would prove the effects he was observing were results of Maxwell's predicted electromagnetic waves. Starting in November 1887 with his paper "On Electromagnetic Effects Produced by Electrical Disturbances in Insulators", Hertz sent a series of papers to Helmholtz at the Berlin Academy, including papers in 1888 that showed transverse free space electromagnetic waves traveling at a finite speed over a distance. In the apparatus Hertz used, the electric and magnetic fields radiated away from the wires as transverse waves. Hertz had positioned the oscillator about 12 meters from a zinc reflecting plate to produce standing waves. Each wave was about 4 meters long. Using the ring detector, he recorded how the wave's magnitude and component direction varied. Hertz measured Maxwell's waves and demonstrated that the velocity of these waves was equal to the velocity of light. The electric field intensity, polarization and reflection of the waves were also measured by Hertz. These experiments established that light and these waves were both a form of electromagnetic radiation obeying the Maxwell equations.. 

Hertz did not realize the practical importance of his radio wave experiments. He stated that,

It's of no use whatsoever ... this is just an experiment that proves Maestro Maxwell was right—we just have these mysterious electromagnetic waves that we cannot see with the naked eye. But they are there.

Asked about the applications of his discoveries, Hertz replied,

Nothing, I guess

Hertz's proof of the existence of airborne electromagnetic waves led to an explosion of experimentation with this new form of electromagnetic radiation, which was called "Hertzian waves" until around 1910 when the term "radio waves" became current.  Within 10 years researchers such as Oliver Lodge, Ferdinand Braun, and Guglielmo Marconi employed radio waves in the first wireless telegraphy radio communication systems, leading to radio broadcasting, and later television. In 1909, Braun and Marconi received the Nobel Prize in physics for their "contributions to the development of wireless telegraphy". Today radio is an essential technology in global telecommunication networks, and the communications medium used by modern wireless devices.

Cathode rays 
In 1892, Hertz began experimenting and demonstrated that cathode rays could penetrate very thin metal foil (such as aluminium). Philipp Lenard, a student of Heinrich Hertz, further researched this "ray effect". He developed a version of the cathode tube and studied the penetration by X-rays of various materials. However, Lenard did not realize that he was producing X-rays. Hermann von Helmholtz formulated mathematical equations for X-rays. He postulated a dispersion theory before Röntgen made his discovery and announcement. It was formed on the basis of the electromagnetic theory of light (Wiedmann's Annalen, Vol. XLVIII). However, he did not work with actual X-rays.

Photoelectric effect 
Hertz helped establish the photoelectric effect (which was later explained by Albert Einstein) when he noticed that a charged object loses its charge more readily when illuminated by ultraviolet radiation (UV). In 1887, he made observations of the photoelectric effect and of the production and reception of electromagnetic (EM) waves, published in the journal Annalen der Physik. His receiver consisted of a coil with a spark gap, whereby a spark would be seen upon detection of EM waves. He placed the apparatus in a darkened box to see the spark better. He observed that the maximum spark length was reduced when in the box. A glass panel placed between the source of EM waves and the receiver absorbed UV that assisted the electrons in jumping across the gap. When removed, the spark length would increase. He observed no decrease in spark length when he substituted quartz for glass, as quartz does not absorb UV radiation. Hertz concluded his months of investigation and reported the results obtained. He did not further pursue investigation of this effect, nor did he make any attempt at explaining how the observed phenomenon was brought about.

Contact mechanics

In 1881 and 1882, Hertz published two articles on what was to become known as the field of contact mechanics, which proved to be an important basis for later theories in the field. Joseph Valentin Boussinesq published some critically important observations on Hertz's work, nevertheless establishing this work on contact mechanics to be of immense importance. His work basically summarises how two axi-symmetric objects placed in contact will behave under loading, he obtained results based upon the classical theory of elasticity and continuum mechanics. The most significant flaw of his theory was the neglect of any nature of adhesion between the two solids, which proves to be important as the materials composing the solids start to assume high elasticity. It was natural to neglect adhesion at the time, however, as there were no experimental methods of testing for it.

To develop his theory Hertz used his observation of elliptical Newton's rings formed upon placing a glass sphere upon a lens as the basis of assuming that the pressure exerted by the sphere follows an elliptical distribution. He used the formation of Newton's rings again while validating his theory with experiments in calculating the displacement which the sphere has into the lens. Kenneth L. Johnson, K. Kendall and A. D. Roberts (JKR) used this theory as a basis while calculating the theoretical displacement or indentation depth in the presence of adhesion in 1971. Hertz's theory is recovered from their formulation if the adhesion of the materials is assumed to be zero. Similar to this theory, however using different assumptions, B. V. Derjaguin, V. M. Muller and Y. P. Toporov published another theory in 1975, which came to be known as the DMT theory in the research community, which also recovered Hertz's formulations under the assumption of zero adhesion. This DMT theory proved to be premature and needed several revisions before it came to be accepted as another material contact theory in addition to the JKR theory. Both the DMT and the JKR theories form the basis of contact mechanics upon which all transition contact models are based and used in material parameter prediction in nanoindentation and atomic force microscopy. These models are central to the field of tribology and he was named as one of the 23 "Men of Tribology" by Duncan Dowson. Despite preceding his great work on electromagnetism (which he himself considered with his characteristic soberness to be trivial), Hertz's research on contact mechanics has facilitated the age of nanotechnology.

Hertz also described the "Hertzian cone", a type of fracture mode in brittle solids caused by the transmission of stress waves.

Meteorology
Hertz always had a deep interest in meteorology, probably derived from his contacts with Wilhelm von Bezold (who was his professor in a laboratory course at the Munich Polytechnic in the summer of 1878).  As an assistant to Helmholtz in Berlin, he contributed a few minor articles in the field, including research on the evaporation of liquids, a new kind of hygrometer, and a graphical means of determining the properties of moist air when subjected to adiabatic changes.

Third Reich treatment
Because Hertz's family converted from Judaism to Lutheranism two decades before his birth, his legacy ran afoul of the Nazi government in the 1930s, a regime that classified people by "race" instead of religious affiliation. 

Hertz's name was removed from streets and institutions and there was even a movement to rename the frequency unit named in his honor (hertz) after Hermann von Helmholtz instead, keeping the symbol (Hz) unchanged. 

His family was also persecuted for their non-Aryan status. Hertz's youngest daughter, Mathilde, lost a lectureship at Berlin University after the Nazis came to power and within a few years she, her sister, and their mother left Germany and settled in England.

Legacy and honors

Heinrich Hertz's nephew Gustav Ludwig Hertz was a Nobel Prize winner, and Gustav's son Carl Helmut Hertz invented medical ultrasonography. His daughter Mathilde Carmen Hertz was a well-known biologist and comparative psychologist. Hertz's grandnephew Hermann Gerhard Hertz, professor at the University of Karlsruhe, was a pioneer of NMR-spectroscopy and in 1995 published Hertz's laboratory notes.

The SI unit hertz (Hz) was established in his honor by the International Electrotechnical Commission in 1930 for frequency, an expression of the number of times that a repeated event occurs per second. It was adopted by the CGPM (Conférence générale des poids et mesures) in 1960, officially replacing the previous name, "cycles per second" (cps).

In 1928 the Heinrich-Hertz Institute for Oscillation Research was founded in Berlin. Today known as the Fraunhofer Institute for Telecommunications, Heinrich Hertz Institute, HHI.

In 1969, in East Germany, a Heinrich Hertz memorial medal was cast. 

The IEEE Heinrich Hertz Medal, established in 1987, is "for outstanding achievements in Hertzian waves [...] presented annually to an individual for achievements which are theoretical or experimental in nature".

The Submillimeter Radio Telescope at Mt. Graham, Arizona, constructed in 1992 is named after him.

A crater that lies on the far side of the Moon, just behind the eastern limb, is the Hertz crater, named in his honor. 

On his birthday in 2012, Google honored Hertz with a Google doodle, inspired by his life's work, on its home page.

Works

See also
Lists and histories

 Fraunhofer Institute for Telecommunications, Heinrich Hertz Institute
 History of radio
 Invention of radio
 List of physicists
 Outline of physics
 Timeline of mechanics and physics
 Electromagnetism timeline
 Wireless telegraphy

 Electromagnetic radiation
 Microwave

 Other
 List of German inventors and discoverers

References

Further reading

 Hertz, H.R. "Ueber sehr schnelle electrische Schwingungen", Annalen der Physik, vol. 267, no. 7, p. 421–448, May 1887 
 Hertz, H.R. "Ueber einen Einfluss des ultravioletten Lichtes auf die electrische Entladung", Annalen der Physik, vol. 267, no. 8, p. 983–1000, June 1887  
 Hertz, H.R. "Ueber die Einwirkung einer geradlinigen electrischen Schwingung auf eine benachbarte Strombahn", Annalen der Physik, vol. 270, no. 5, p. 155–170, March 1888  
 Hertz, H.R. "Ueber die Ausbreitungsgeschwindigkeit der electrodynamischen Wirkungen", Annalen der Physik, vol. 270, no. 7, p. 551–569, May 1888  
 Hertz, H. R.(1899) The Principles of Mechanics Presented in a New Form, London, Macmillan, with an introduction by Hermann von Helmholtz (English translation of Die Prinzipien der Mechanik in neuem Zusammenhange dargestellt, Leipzig, posthumously published in 1894).
 Jenkins, John D. "The Discovery of Radio Waves – 1888; Heinrich Rudolf Hertz (1847–1894)" (retrieved 27 Jan 2008)
 Naughton, Russell. "Heinrich Rudolph (alt: Rudolf) Hertz, Dr : 1857 – 1894" (retrieved 27 Jan 2008)
 Roberge, Pierre R. "Heinrich Rudolph Hertz, 1857–1894" (retrieved 27 Jan 2008)
 Appleyard, Rollo. (1930). Pioneers of Electrical Communication". London: Macmillan and Company. reprinted by Ayer Company Publishers, Manchester, New Hampshire: 
 Bodanis, David. (2006). Electric Universe: How Electricity Switched on the Modern World. New York: Three Rivers Press. 
 Buchwald, Jed Z. (1994). The Creation of Scientific Effects: Heinrich Hertz and Electric Waves. Chicago: University of Chicago Press. 
 Bryant, John H. (1988). Heinrich Hertz, the Beginning of Microwaves: Discovery of Electromagnetic Waves and Opening of the Electromagnetic Spectrum by Heinrich Hertz in the Years 1886–1892. New York: IEEE (Institute of Electrical and Electronics Engineers). 
 Lodge, Oliver Joseph. (1900). Signaling Across Space without Wires by Electric Waves: Being a Description of the work of [Heinrich] Hertz and his Successors. reprinted by Arno Press, New York, 1974. 
 Maugis, Daniel. (2000). Contact, Adhesion and Rupture of Elastic Solids. New York: Springer-Verlag. 
 Susskind, Charles. (1995). Heinrich Hertz: A Short Life. San Francisco: San Francisco Press.

External links

 
 

 
1857 births
1894 deaths
19th-century German inventors
19th-century German physicists
Burials at the Ohlsdorf Cemetery
German Lutherans
German male writers
German people of Jewish descent
German philosophers
Humboldt University of Berlin alumni
Academic staff of the Karlsruhe Institute of Technology
People educated at the Gelehrtenschule des Johanneums
Radio pioneers
Recipients of the Matteucci Medal
Scientists from Hamburg
Technical University of Munich alumni
Tribologists
Academic staff of the University of Bonn
Academic staff of the University of Kiel